"Youthless" is a song by Beck. It was released as the third single from his album Modern Guilt in 2008.  The single release of the song features an alternative mix of "Youthless" and a non album song entitled "Half & Half". The 7-inch single is pressed on white vinyl. The digital download of the single is only available in the UK.

Track listing
 "Youthless" (Mix K) (3:01)
 "Half & Half" (2:21)

Music video
The music video, directed by Kris Moyes, features Beck's toys, dolls and statues being crafted by hands with gloves, then the dolls and Beck's toys start to sing and dance.

Personnel
Beck Hansen – vocals, guitar, producer, songwriter
Matt Mahaffey – bass guitar
Greg Kurstin – synthesizer
Brian LeBarton – synthesizer
Danger Mouse – beats, producer
Larry Corbett – cello

References

External links

2008 singles
Beck songs
XL Recordings singles
Songs written by Beck
2008 songs